John Evans (10 September 1875 – 18 April 1961) was a Labour Party politician in the United Kingdom. He was elected as Member of Parliament (MP) for Ogmore at a by-election in 1946, but stood down at the 1950 general election.

John Evans, a fluent Welsh speaker, was elected MP for Ogmore in 1946, following a by-election, caused by the resignation of Ted Williams who had been appointed as high commissioner to Australia. It was said by many that at 70 years of age he was too old for the job but it is well to remember that Winston Churchill became prime minister for the second time at 76 and remained an MP into his eighties.

Early life and career
John Evans was born at Cwmparc in the Rhondda Valley in September 1875 and attended the local Park Board School. He started work at twelve years of age in the local colliery where he remained for the next 20 years before winning a place at Ruskin College. On his return he became union secretary at Coegnant colliery, Maesteg. By now he was living at Nantyffyllon. He was elected to Maesteg UDC (1916–37) and Glamorgan CC (1913–46).

Parliamentary career
In 1929 he stood unsuccessfully for parliament in Montgomeryshire, and in 1931 he failed to get the nomination for Ogmore losing out to Ted Williams.

Surprisingly, as the sitting MP, he failed to gain the nomination, from the Ogmore Labour Party, for the 1950 General Election, despite being steeped in mining tradition and Welsh Culture.  Walter Padley gained the nomination and went on to be the MP for the next 29 years.

Later life
Shortly after his non-selection, John Evans moved to Tongwynlais near Cardiff and from there won a seat on Glamorgan CC in 1952, at the grand age of 75. 

John Evans died in 1961, aged 85.

References 
 

1875 births
1961 deaths
National Union of Mineworkers-sponsored MPs
Welsh Labour Party MPs
UK MPs 1945–1950
Members of Glamorgan County Council